KPOB may refer to:

 KPOB-TV, a television station (channel 15) licensed to Poplar Bluff, Missouri, United States
 the ICAO code for Pope Air Force Base